Grabowo  is a village in the administrative district of Gmina Gołdap, within Gołdap County, Warmian-Masurian Voivodeship, in north-eastern Poland, close to the border with the Kaliningrad Oblast of Russia. It is located in the historic region of Masuria.

History
The local church was founded in 1589. In the late 19th century, the village had a population of 521.

References

Villages in Gołdap County